The year 1816 in science and technology involved some significant events, listed below.

Botany
 Botanic Gardens, Sydney, established in Australia.

Chemistry
 Veuve Clicquot invents the riddling table process to clarify champagne.

Mathematics
 John Farey notes the Farey sequence.

Medicine
 René Laennec invents the stethoscope.
 Caleb Parry publishes An Experimental Inquiry into the Nature, Cause and Varieties of the Arterial Pulse, describing the mechanisms for the pulse.

Mineralogy
 Johann Fischer von Waldheim publishes Essai sur la Turquoise et sur la Calaite in Moscow, the first scientific treatise on the mineral turquoise.

Physics
 Sir David Brewster (1781–1868) discovers stress birefringence.

Technology
 January 9 – Sir Humphry Davy's Davy lamp is first tested underground as a coal mining safety lamp at Hebburn Colliery in north east England.
 The Spider Bridge at Falls of Schuylkill, a temporary iron-wire footbridge erected across the Schuylkill River, north of Philadelphia, Pennsylvania, is the first wire-cable suspension bridge in history.
 Johann Nepomuk Maelzel begins production of the metronome with a scale.
 Rev. Robert Stirling obtains a patent in the United Kingdom for the Stirling hot air engine.
 approx. date – Simeon North in New England produces a practicable milling machine for working metal.

Awards
 Copley Medal: Not awarded

Births
 January 2 – Anastasie Fătu, Moldavian and Romanian physician and naturalist (died 1886)
 July 7 – Rudolf Wolf, Swiss astronomer (died 1893)
 July 20 – Sir William Bowman, 1st Baronet, English ophthalmologist, histologist and anatomist (died 1892)
 December 13 – Werner Siemens, German electrical engineer (died 1892)

Deaths
 January 2 – Louis-Bernard Guyton de Morveau, French chemist (born 1737)
 April 7 – Christian Konrad Sprengel, German botanist (born 1750)
 September 18 – Bernard McMahon, Irish American horticulturalist (born c. 1775)
 September 28 – Edward Howard, English chemist (born 1774)
 December 15 – Charles Stanhope, 3rd Earl Stanhope, English engineer (born 1753)

References

 
19th century in science
1810s in science